V429 Geminorum (BD+20°1790) is a young orange dwarf star in the constellation Gemini, located 90 light years away from the Sun.  It is a BY Draconis variable, a cool dwarf which varies rapidly in brightness as it rotates.

Description
The star is young and very active and is a member of the AB Doradus Moving Group. The star has also been studied and monitored by SuperWASP group and found to coincide with the ROSAT source 1RXS J072343.6+202500. The planet candidate was announced in December 2009.

Disproven planet

The Keplerian fit of the radial velocity data suggested an orbital solution for a close-in massive planet with an orbital period of 7.7834 days. Moreover, the presence of a close-in massive jovian planet could explain the high level of stellar activity detected. However, further study suggests that this planet may not exist because the radial velocity variations are strongly correlated to stellar activity, suggesting this activity is the cause of the variations. This echoes the similar case of the disproven planet detection around TW Hydrae, which was also found to be due to stellar activity rather than orbital motion.

References

See also
 List of extrasolar planets

K-type main-sequence stars
Gemini (constellation)
BD+20 1790
Hypothetical planetary systems
Geminorum, V429
BY Draconis variables